Denmark was represented by Birthe Wilke, with the song "Uh, jeg ville ønske jeg var dig", at the 1959 Eurovision Song Contest, which took place on 11 March in Cannes, France. "Uh, jeg ville ønske jeg var dig" was chosen as the Danish entry at the Dansk Melodi Grand Prix on 12 February. Wilke had previously come third for Denmark in the 1957 contest in a duet with Gustav Winckler, who was one of her competitors in the 1959 DMGP.

Before Eurovision

Dansk Melodi Grand Prix 1959
The DMGP was held at Radiohuset in Frederiksberg, hosted by Sejr Volmer-Sørensen. Two male and two female singers took part, each performing one solo song and one duet. The winning song was chosen by a 4-member jury, and only the top three songs were announced.

The winning title "Uh, jeg ville ønske jeg var dig" was written by Carl Andersen and composed by Otto Lington.

At Eurovision
On the night, "Uh, jeg ville ønske jeg var dig" was conducted by Kai Mortensen, and Birthe Wilke performed second in the running order, following  and preceding . Like most of the other songs in the contest it was somewhat old-fashioned in style with no hint of contemporary chart music, but Birthe Wilke gave an energetic and engaging performance. At the close of voting the song had received 12 points, placing Denmark 5th of the 11 entries. The Danish jury awarded its highest mark of 4 to France. It was succeeded as Danish representative at the 1960 contest by Katy Bødtger with "Det var en yndig tid".

Voting

References 

1959
Countries in the Eurovision Song Contest 1959
Eurovision